A protective security unit typically provides policing, security, intelligence and bodyguard services for sovereigns and politicians. It can be contrasted with a security service, which provide protective security intelligence such as the British Security Service; and a guards regiment for the defence of the Sovereign and the metropolis. Examples of these include the Household Division.

There are also distinct non-combat personal bodyguards which serve as ceremonial guards and personal attendants (such as the Gentlemen at Arms, the Yeomen of the Guard, the Royal Company of Archers, and the Company of Pikemen and Musketeers of the Honourable Artillery Company, as well as the Corps of Serjeants at Arms, the Gold Stick and Silver Stick, and the High Constables and Guard of Honour of the Palace of Holyroodhouse).

Well-known examples include the Royalty and Diplomatic Protection Department of the London Metropolitan Police, the United States Secret Service, and the Diplomatic Security Service of the United States Department of State. Typically they provide security and any ceremonial effect is not per se an objective.

In Ireland, the Garda Síochána (Irish Police) Special Detective Unit (SDU) and Emergency Response Unit (ERU) provide armed protection and transport for the Irish President, Michael D. Higgins and the Taoiseach (Prime Minister) Micheál Martin. The unit also provides protection for senior government officials, diplomatic staff and visiting dignitaries to Ireland.

In Northern Ireland the Police Service of Northern Ireland (PSNI) Close Protection Unit (CPU) provides protection to visiting dignitaries on visits to Northern Ireland as well as to the Secretary of State, members of the Royal Family and Government ministers.

See also
 List of protective service agencies

References

 
Bodyguards